Eslamabad (also Romanized as Eslāmābād) is a village in Bikah Rural District, Bikah District, Rudan County, Hormozgan Province, Iran. At the 2006 census, its population was 4,816, in 997 families.

References 

Populated places in Rudan County